is a Japanese footballer currently playing as a forward for JEF United Chiba. He is of Nigerian descent.

Career statistics
.

Notes

References

External links

2001 births
Living people
Japanese footballers
Japan youth international footballers
Association football forwards
J2 League players
JEF United Chiba players
Japanese people of Nigerian descent